Soroush Cinema (formerly known as: Moulin Rouge Cinema is one of the old cinema of Tehran which opened on October 15, 1956. The first movie showed in this cinema was Trapeze. Moulin Rouge cinema was designed by Heydar Ghiai, a pioneer of modern architecture in Iran. The Chain Cinemas of Moulin Rouge included eight cinemas which founded by akhavan brothers in 1955. These cinemas were named Mahtab, Berelian, zohre, Crystal and Moulin Rouge. These cinemas showed movies from Paramount Pictures and United Artists studios. This cinema is located in Shariati Street. It has been closed for a short time due to renovation and opened again in August 2013.The first movie shown in this cinema after renovation was Shahre moshha 2 The new Cinema Soroush has three saloons  with capacity of 330, 200 and 100 person each.

References

Buildings and structures in Tehran
1956 establishments in Iran
Cinemas in Iran
Buildings and structures completed in 1956